Yes, Yes, Nanette is a 1925 American silent film comedy starring Lyle Tayo and James Finlayson.  It also features Oliver Hardy and was co-directed by Stan Laurel. Yes, Yes, Nanette is a parody of the contemporary musical comedy No, No, Nanette.

Cast
 Lyle Tayo as Nanette
 Jimmie Finlayson as Hillory, the new husband
 Jack Gavin as Father of Ten Children
 Grant Gorman as Sonny
 Sally O'Neil  as Daughter (as Sue O'Neill)
 Lyle Tayo as The Bride
 Oliver Hardy as Her former sweetheart (as "Babe" Hardy)
 Pete the Pup

See also
 List of American films of 1925

References

External links

1925 films
1925 comedy films
1925 short films
American silent short films
Silent American comedy films
American black-and-white films
Films directed by Stan Laurel
American comedy short films
1920s American films